Alabama Power Company, headquartered in Birmingham, Alabama, is a company in the southern United States that provides electricity service to 1.4 million customers in the southern two-thirds of Alabama. It also operates appliance stores. It is one of four U.S. utilities operated by the Southern Company, one of the nation's largest generators of electricity.

Alabama Power is an investor-owned, tax-paying utility, and the second largest subsidiary of Southern Company.

Alabama Power's hydroelectric generating plants encompass several lakes on the Tallapoosa, Coosa, and Black Warrior rivers, as well as coal, oil, natural gas, nuclear and cogeneration plants in various parts of the state.

Pollution

In 1999, the United States Environmental Protection Agency commenced an enforcement action against Alabama Power under the Clean Air Act. In 2006, the EPA announced that Alabama Power had agreed to spend more than $200 m to upgrade pollution controls as a partial settlement of this action. The settlement did not include claims regarding five coal-fired plants. Those claims proceeded to trial, and Alabama Power prevailed. However, the Southern Environmental Law Center (SELC) has stated that they intend to appeal the ruling. SELC was involved in a case against Duke Energy that was appealed to the Supreme Court in 2006.

, AP's coal-fired James H. Miller Jr. Electric Generating Plant is the single largest emitter of carbon dioxide in the United States.

Public benefits

In addition to generating electricity, the waters surrounding the plants offer recreational opportunities for Alabama residents and visitors.

The Alabama Power Foundation is a non-profit foundation providing grants for watershed, environmental and community projects along the Coosa River and within the state of Alabama

Allegations of media manipulation

An investigation by National Public Radio and Floodlight News found Alabama Power paid consulting firm Matrix LLC, which in turn allegedly paid newspapers or affiliated groups which ran positive coverage of Alabama Power, namely Yellowhammer News, the Alabama Political Reporter (for which Matrix designed the website), and Alabama Today.

Terry Dunn ran and won a campaign for a seat on the Alabama Public Service Commission promising to hold a formal rate hearing to investigate Alabama Power's financials and why electricity prices in Alabama are among the highest in the country. He alleges a utility company lobbyist warned him to be a team player if he wanted to keep his seat, and that utility-funded newspapers conducted a smear campaign that resulted in Dunn losing the next election and avoided the promised rate hearing.

In 2017, Matrix hired a private investigator to surveil Southern Company CEO Tom Fanning near his home.

Power generating facilities

Fossil fuel plants

Hydroelectric plants

Nuclear plants

Cogeneration and other plants

See also

 Alabama Power Headquarters Building

References

Notes

External links
 Alabama Power website
 Southern Company website
 Alabama Power Company on encyclopediaofalabama.org

 
Electric power companies of the United States
Southern Company
Energy infrastructure in Alabama
Hydroelectric power companies of the United States
Nuclear power companies of the United States
Companies based in Birmingham, Alabama
American companies established in 1906
Energy companies established in 1906
Non-renewable resource companies established in 1906
1906 establishments in Alabama
Lists of coordinates